Shooting at the 2010 Asian Games was held in Aoti Shooting Range in Guangzhou, China between 13 November and 24 November 2010.

Schedule

Medalists

Men

Women

Medal table

Participating nations
A total of 520 athletes from 37 nations competed in shooting at the 2010 Asian Games:

References 

 ISSF Results Overview

External links
Shooting site of 2010 Asian Games

 
2010 Asian Games events
2010
Asian Games
Shooting competitions in China